Propper is a manufacturer of clothing and gear for tactical, law enforcement, public safety, and military applications. Since 1967 it has been one of the main uniform suppliers to the United States military.

History
Propper International was founded in 1967 by William S. Propper and landed its first government contract with the U.S. Navy, manufacturing the iconic white sailor caps known as "Dixie cups." As one of the largest official suppliers to the United States armed forces, Propper International has manufactured over 60 million garments for the U.S. Department of Defense – Army, Air Force, Navy, Marines, Coast Guard and Special Forces. Propper also manufactures apparel for the commercial military, tactical, law enforcement, and public safety markets and sells through both dealer/retailer channels and online through e-commerce. Propper commercial products are distributed through more than 2,500 military and law enforcement and specialty retail stores and websites across the country.

Products
Propper's core product has always been the current standard issue U.S. military uniform. More recently, they expanded their product line to include clothing for law enforcement officers, firefighters and emergency medical personnel.

Military
Propper is a prime contractor in nearly every branch of the U.S. military. In 2015 the company began offering boots.

The Propper Battle Dress Uniform was issued to the U.S. Army, Navy, Marines and Air Force. It used M81 Woodland and Desert Camouflage.

The Army Combat Uniform is the current combat uniform worn by the U.S. Army. It introduced the Universal Camouflage Pattern and also uses MultiCam pattern in Operation Enduring Freedom in Afghanistan during military operations.
Airman Battle Uniform
Marine Corps Combat Utility Uniform
Other garments manufactured by Propper and worn by branches of the military include:

Multi-Climate Protection System (MCPS) Types 1, 2 and 3 (All branches)
CWU/27P Nomex Flight Suit (All branches)
Generation 2 Extreme Cold Weather Clothing System (Gen 2 ECWCS) (Army)
All Purpose Environmental Clothing System (APECS) (Air Force and Marines)
Flame-Resistant Organizational Gear (FROG) Combat Shirt and Trouser (Marines)
Flame-Resistant Army Combat Uniform (FR ACU) (Army)
NFPA-Compliant Airman Battle Uniform (Air Force)
Foul Weather Parka II (Coast Guard)
Foul Weather Liner II (Coast Guard)

Law Enforcement 
Propper introduced a full line of body armour for military and law enforcement use in January 2016. The 4PV, in both men's and women's versions, offers wearers better comfort and protection than the typical "clamshell" two-panel design found in most other body armour. In addition to concealable body armor, Propper also introduced a full range of tactical body armor with ballistic plates front and back for added protection to meet NIJ threat level standards.

In addition to armor, Propper also provides a full range of police uniforms, tactical pants, and tactical bags. One bag, the UC Pack, is based on the Marine Corps FILBE complete with MOLLE attachment points and extensive use of hook and loop fasteners.

Awards
Propper has received 7 awards from the Defense Logistics Agency dating as far back as 1995.

 2015 – DLA Silver Supplier
 2014 – DLA Silver Supplier
 2011 – Employer Partnership of the Armed Forces
 2011 – DOD Employer Support of the Guard and Reserve
 2004 – DLA Vendor Excellence Award Operation Enduring Freedom and Operation Iraqi Freedom
 2004 – Vendor Excellence Award
 1995 – Vendor of the Year

References

External links

 

Clothing manufacturers
United States military uniforms
Law enforcement uniforms